Esmail (Esmael, Ismail, or Ismael) Kiram may also refer to:

 Mohammed Esmail Kiram I (Esmail E. Kiram I)
 Esmail Kiram II